Cruinniú na nÓg (Gathering of Youth) is an annual national day of free creative activities for children and young people under the age of 18 in Ireland.

History
The Cruinniú na nÓg event has been held annually since 2018. Due to the COVID-19 pandemic, the 2020 and 2021 events were run as a series of primarily online and virtual activities. The 2022 program returned to in-person live events for the first time since 2019, with over 450 free creative events for young people in Ireland.

References

External links
 Official website

Annual events in the Republic of Ireland
Summer events in the Republic of Ireland
Childhood in Ireland